The Dutch National Jamboree is a jamboree organized by Scouting Nederland for the Scouting age groups scouts (11–15 years old) and explorers (15–18 years old). It is organized every four years. Though is can be characterized as a national event, the Jamboree also welcomes foreign scouts.

History 
In 1985, a 75-year Dutch Scouting jubilee Jamboree was organised. This was not yet named National Jamboree, but can be characterized as one. The first Dutch National Jamboree took place in 2000 and was located in Dronten. Parts of the event area were also used as the location for the World Jamboree 1995 as well as the European Jamboree 1994, though the event is much smaller than its global and European equivalents. The second and third edition took place on Landgoed Velder in Boxtel and hosted around 4.000 participants. The last edition was a special Dutch scouting centenary edition. Though a 2012 edition was prepared, it was cancelled due to lack of subscribers.

Activities 
The Nationale Jamboree's program contained a lot of activities, as: hiking, canoeing, make torches, climbing, music, theater, international buffet, swopping, open stage, mountainbiking, friendship award, Scout FM, raft building, film night and a party.

Overview

See also
Jamboree

References

External links
 
 

Scouting and Guiding in the Netherlands
Scouting jamborees